Gamburg is an unincorporated community in Ripley County, in the U.S. state of Missouri.

History
A post office called Gamburg was established in 1880, and remained in operation until 1931. The community derives its name from the last name of the local Gamblin family.

References

Unincorporated communities in Ripley County, Missouri
Unincorporated communities in Missouri